Babindella is a genus of flies in the family Dolichopodidae from Australia. It is the only genus in the subfamily Babindellinae, and is named after Babinda, the type locality.

Species 
The genus contains two species:
 Babindella physoura Bickel, 1987
 Babindella whianensis Bickel, 1987

References 

Dolichopodidae genera
Babindellinae
Diptera of Australasia